S. Ramu  is a Singaporean football forward who played for Singapore in the 1984 Asian Cup.

References
Stats

Singaporean footballers
Singapore international footballers
Living people
1984 AFC Asian Cup players
Association football forwards
Year of birth missing (living people)
Singaporean people of Tamil descent
Singaporean sportspeople of Indian descent